Makiyamaia gravis is a species of sea snail, a marine gastropod mollusk in the family Clavatulidae.

Description
The height of the shell attains 37 mm.

Distribution
This marine species occurs off the Agulhas Bank, South Africa

References

 Kilburn, R. N. "Turridae (Mollusca: Gastropoda) of southern Africa and Mozambique. Part 2. Subfamily Clavatulinae." Annals of the Natal Museum 26.2 (1985): 417–470.
 Kilburn R.N., Fedosov A.E. & Olivera B.M. (2012) Revision of the genus Turris Batsch, 1789 (Gastropoda: Conoidea: Turridae) with the description of six new species. Zootaxa 3244: 1–58.

External links
 

Endemic fauna of South Africa
gravis
Gastropods described in 1843